Abry is a French surname, most prevalent in France.

Notable people with this surname include:
 Léon Abry (1857-1905), Belgian painter
 Patrice Abry, French engineer

See also
 Abry (disambiguation)

References